A Band Called Pain (abbreviated ABCP) are an American heavy metal band from Oakland, California.

The band was formed by cousins Allen Richardson (also known as Allen Anthony formerly of the Roc-A-Fella Records R&B group Christion) and Shaun Bivens who both hail from the San Francisco Bay Area.  The band's debut studio album Broken Dreams was released in 2006, and was dubbed one of the ten best (#6) California albums of the year by Zero Magazine. The first single from the album is the song "The Pieces".  The song has a music video as well.  The band's song "Holy" appeared on the Saw II soundtrack.

A Band Called Pain is also notable for being a rare heavy metal band consisting of four African American members. Guitarist Bivens alluded to this saying:

The band is also the only heavy metal act released on the independent, alternative hip hop label, Hieroglyphics Imperium Recordings.

ABCP has performed at the South By Southwest festival in Austin, Texas.

In October 2008, Tony Providence left the band and was replaced by Akili Peyton the following year.

Sometime after 2010, the band decided to take a hiatus to focus on other musical projects.

In January 2019, A Band Called Pain announced a one-off reunion show at The Uptown Nightclub in Oakland, California with the original line up on March 30, 2019.

On January 10, 2021, guitarist Shaun Bivens announced on facebook that A Band Called Pain is recording their first EP, titled "56 Down", since the release of "Beautiful Gun" back in 2010. On March 26, "56 Down" was released to the public. It is currently unknown if this will be a full return of the band.

Members

lineup
Allen Richardson — vocals (2001–2010, 2019, 2021-present)
Shaun Bivens — guitars (2001–2010, 2019, 2021-present)
Bryan Dean (aka Dark Kent) — bass (2001–2010, 2019, 2021-present)
Tony Providence — drums (2001–2008, 2019, 2021-present)

Former members
Akili Peyton (aka Killz Atwillz) — drums (2009–2010)

Discography
Broken Dreams (2005)
Beautiful Gun (2010)
56 Down - EP (2021)

References

External links
A Band Called Pain -- Official Website
A Band Called Pain's MySpace

Heavy metal musical groups from California
African-American heavy metal musical groups
Musical groups from Oakland, California
Musical quartets